Y'avait un prisonnier is a play by French dramatist Jean Anouilh. It consists of three acts and was first performed at the Theatre of the Ambassador's in Paris in 1934.

Plot 
Ludovic is a successful businessman but an error of judgement drives him to bankruptcy. Condemned to fifteen years' imprisonment in Italy, he finds his family at Cannes aboard the luxurious yacht of his brother-in-law, Guillaume Barricault. The latter has arranged the marriage of Anne-Marie, the daughter of Adeline from a first marriage, to the young Gaston Dupont-Dufort whose family is particularly influential, in order to restore the family's respectability sullied by Ludovic's errors. However, the experience of prison has profoundly changed the latter's character.

Plays by Jean Anouilh
1934 plays